Hashim Abdul Halim (5 June 1935 – 2 November 2015) was an Indian Communist and politician who was Speaker of the West Bengal Legislative Assembly from 1982 to 2011.

Life and career
Halim started his career as a practising lawyer. Halim's father was Abdul Halim, one of the founders of the Communist Party of India in Bengal. He was also an Alderman at the Kolkata Municipal Corporation, his uncle, M. Ishaque was a member of the Congress Party and a freedom fighter. He has also served as the Chairman of the Commonwealth Parliamentary Association and President of the World Federation of United Nations Association.

A member of the Communist Party of India (Marxist), he was elected to the Legislative Assembly of West Bengal for the first time in 1977. Thereafter, he served in the assembly for six terms, from 1977 to 2011. He was the Minister for Judicial Affairs in the Government of West Bengal from 1977 to 1982 and subsequently served as Speaker of the Legislative Assembly from 1982 to 2011. He was the MLA for Amdanga constituency from 1977 to 2006, when he shifted his constituency to the Entally constituency. He was the MLA from Entally until 2011. He has served in numerous departments and committees of West Bengal. Halim has also represented West Bengal at numerous seminars in India and abroad. Halim was the longest-serving speaker of any legislative assembly in India, serving for a consecutive 29 years from 6 May 1982 to May 2011. After the 2011 elections in West Bengal, Halim was replaced by Biman Banerjee as the Speaker of the West Bengal Vidhan Sabha.

Halim held a master's degree in commerce, a bachelor's degree in law and was awarded an honorary doctorate by Soka University, Tokyo. He was married and had four children. His son, Fuad Halim, was the CPI(M) candidate for the Ballygunge constituency in the 2011 West Bengal elections, but lost to Trinamool Congress' Subrata Mukherjee by 41,000 votes.

Halim died on 2 November 2015 in Kolkata at the age of 80.

References

1935 births
2015 deaths
West Bengal MLAs 1977–1982
West Bengal MLAs 1982–1987
West Bengal MLAs 1987–1991
West Bengal MLAs 1991–1996
West Bengal MLAs 1996–2001
West Bengal MLAs 2001–2006
West Bengal MLAs 2006–2011
Communist Party of India (Marxist) politicians from West Bengal
State cabinet ministers of West Bengal
Speakers of the West Bengal Legislative Assembly